Minuscule 914 (in the Gregory-Aland numbering), α 383 (von Soden), is a 13th-century Greek minuscule manuscript of the New Testament on parchment. The manuscript has not survived in complete condition.

Description 

The codex contains the text of the Book of Acts, Catholic epistles and Pauline epistles, on 344 parchment leaves (size ).

The text is written in one column per page, and 18 lines per page.

It has lacuna at the end. Some leaves of the codex were destroyed by fire.

It contains lectionary markings at the margin for liturgical reading. The manuscript is ornamented.

Text 
Kurt Aland the Greek text of the codex placed in Category V.
It means it is a representative of the Byzantine text-type.

History 

According to Scrivener and C. R. Gregory the manuscript was written in the 13th century. Currently the manuscript is dated by the INTF to the 13th century.

It was described by Miller R.

The manuscript was added to the list of New Testament manuscripts by Scrivener (202a) and Gregory (230a). In 1908 Gregory gave the number 914 to it.

It is currently housed in the Biblioteca de El Escorial (R. III. 4) in Escurial.

See also 

 List of New Testament minuscules
 Biblical manuscript
 Textual criticism

References

Further reading

External links 
 

Greek New Testament minuscules
13th-century biblical manuscripts